Ballauff is a surname. Notable people with the surname include:

Peter Ballauff (born 1963), German tennis player
Matthias Ballauff (born 1952), German chemist and physicist